Der Meteor is the sixtieth release by Tangerine Dream. It was released in 1997. It is the first and only release of ten scheduled science fiction audio novels for children in German language.

Track listing

Personnel
Edgar Froese - synthesizers, guitar
Jerome Froese - synthesizers

References

1997 albums
Tangerine Dream albums